The Booth Theater is a historic movie theater located at 119 W. Myrtle St. in Independence, Kansas. The building was constructed in 1911 and renovated for use as a movie theater in 1926–27. The redesigned theater was the first in Independence to be designed specifically for use as a movie theater. The Boller Brothers, an architectural firm known for their theater designs, designed the theater in a mixture of the Spanish Renaissance and Italian Renaissance Revival styles. The theater showed films until its closure in 1980.

The theater was listed on the National Register of Historic Places in 1988.

References

External links
 Cinema Treasure: Booth Theater

Boller Brothers buildings
Theatres on the National Register of Historic Places in Kansas
Theatres completed in 1926
Buildings and structures in Montgomery County, Kansas
Spanish Revival architecture in Kansas
Italian Renaissance Revival architecture in the United States
Theatres in Kansas
1926 establishments in Kansas
Theatres completed in 1911
1911 establishments in Kansas
National Register of Historic Places in Montgomery County, Kansas
Independence, Kansas